Verchen is a municipality in the Mecklenburgische Seenplatte district, in Mecklenburg-Vorpommern, Germany. The Battle of Verchen occurred nearby in 1164.

References